Sim Jae-won (born 11 March 1977) is a South Korean footballer.

His previous club was Busan I'Park, Gwangju Sangmu Bulsajo in South Korea and Eintracht Frankfurt in Germany and Changsha Ginde in China.

He has played in the 1997 FIFA World Youth Championship for the South Korea national team and at the 2000 Summer Olympics for the South Korea national team.

Sim has represented South Korea in senior team squads from 1998 to 2001. His A-match first goal was 5 April 2000, against Laos at Dongdaemun Stadium for Asian Cup first qualification match.

Club career statistics

International goals
Results list South Korea's goal tally first.

External links
 
 National Team Player Record 
 
 

1977 births
Living people
Association football fullbacks
South Korean footballers
South Korean expatriate footballers
South Korea international footballers
Busan IPark players
Eintracht Frankfurt players
Gimcheon Sangmu FC players
Changsha Ginde players
Gangneung City FC players
K League 1 players
Korea National League players
Chinese Super League players
Expatriate footballers in Germany
Expatriate footballers in China
South Korean expatriate sportspeople in Germany
South Korean expatriate sportspeople in China
Footballers at the 2000 Summer Olympics
2000 AFC Asian Cup players
Olympic footballers of South Korea
Sportspeople from Daejeon
Yonsei University alumni
Footballers at the 1998 Asian Games
Asian Games competitors for South Korea